Brandon Williams (born 20 September 1989) is a South African cricketer who played for Boland during the 2009–10 season. A right-handed batsman and left-arm orthodox spin bowler, he played his maiden first-class match on 28 January 2010 against South Western Districts. He also played for Border.

References

External links
Brandon Williams profile at CricketArchive

1989 births
Living people
Cricketers from East London, Eastern Cape
South African cricketers
Boland cricketers
Border cricketers